Saharuni was a region and family of Armenia c. 400–800.

The first known ruler is Bat Saharuni (see Mamikonian) c. 380.

The ruler about 451 was Karen Saharuni; in 482 was Qadchadch Saharuni; c. 630 the ruler was David Saharuni.

Vasak of Kardjet ruled the region since 772. Then his son Adarnase. Ashot, son of Adarnase, was ruler in the 9th century.

See also
List of regions of old Armenia

Early medieval Armenian regions
Armenian nobility
Armenian noble families